Inishnabro is one of the Blasket Islands of County Kerry, Ireland.

Geography 

Inishnabro is separated from Inishvickillane by a narrow sound (ca. 200 metres), and rises to 229 metres, and has an area of 49.15 hectares.

History 
Early in 1970s, the U.S. commercial space pioneer Gary Hudson proposed using Inis na Bró as the launching site for a new rocket system. The proposal only became public in 2003, when Irish Government files from the period were released under the 30-year rule.

References

Blasket Islands
Uninhabited islands of Ireland
Marilyns of Ireland